This is a comprehensive list of speakers of the South Dakota House of Representatives since statehood in 1889.

 For information about the House of Representatives, see South Dakota House of Representatives

Five South Dakota speakers have gone on to serve as governor.

References

Speakers of the South Dakota House of Representatives
Speaker
South Dakota